Alexandra Salmela (née Balážová; born November 7, 1980, in Bratislava) is a Slovak author, best known for her Finnish novel 27 eli kuolema tekee taiteilijan (2010), for which she won a Helsingin Sanomat Literature Prize, and was nominated for a Finlandia Prize.

References 

1980 births
Living people
Slovak writers